Nikolsk Urban Settlement is the name of several municipal formations in Russia.

Nikolsk Urban Settlement, a municipal formation which the town of district significance of Nikolsk in Nikolsky District of Penza Oblast is incorporated as
Nikolsk Urban Settlement, a municipal formation which the town of district significance of Nikolsk in Nikolsky District of Vologda Oblast is incorporated as

See also
Nikolsk
Nikolsky (disambiguation)
Nikolay (disambiguation)

References

Notes

Sources

